Franco, Ciccio e il pirata Barbanera (Franco, Ciccio and Blackbeard the Pirate) is a 1969 Italian comedy film directed by Mario Amendola starring the comic duo Franco and Ciccio. Is a parody of the 1883 adventure novel Treasure Island of Scottish author Robert Louis Stevenson.

Plot 
England, 1700: Franco is the illegitimate son of a pirate died at sea, and now he works as a waiter in a tavern. Ciccio is an unfortunate Capitan Black who tries to bring up his image as that of a great bloody killer. The two meet in a ship, where Franco discovers a map where there are directions to a mysterious island, where there's buried the treasure of the notorious pirate Flint. Ciccio then proposes to recruit a crew, and so doesn't realize that between the hubs and the people of the sea enters the dreaded pirate Blackbeard, who's seeking revenge, because years ago he helped Flint earning the coveted treasure...

Cast 
 Franco Franchi as Franco
 Ciccio Ingrassia as  Capitan Black
 Fernando Sancho as Blackbeard the Pirate 
 Mimmo Palmara as Flint  the Pirate 
 Pietro Tordi as Johnson the Pirate 
 Rosita Torosh as  Aluna		
 Umberto D'Orsi as  Creditor of Capitan Black		
 Enzo Andronico as  Cane Nero
 Ignazio Balsamo as pirate Manolo

References

External links

1969 films
1960s adventure comedy films
1960s buddy comedy films
Films directed by Mario Amendola
Italian buddy comedy films
Italian adventure comedy films
Treasure Island films
1969 comedy films
Films scored by Roberto Pregadio
1960s Italian films